Mario Artistico (born 3 April 1985) is an Italian footballer who plays as a striker for Palmese.

Artistico has played for 16 clubs since the 2002–03 season, most of them in the Lega Pro. Mario is the brother of Edoardo, another striker.

Career

Early career
Born in Rome, capital of Italy, Artistico started his career at three Serie D club, namely Astrea, Brescello and Monterotondo (where he also played for their reserve). Except Brescello, the two other teams were either inside Rome or within the Province of Rome. Monterotondo scored the most goals in Group E that season (64); however, the club finished 7th, 7 points away from the playoff qualifier Albalonga.

Artistico goal scoring record made him earned a professional contract from Serie A club Udinese Calcio. Artistico was immediately farmed to Chieti, a Serie C1 club. However, he had to learn to play in higher division, which he only scored once.

Cisco Roma
In mid-2006 he returned to Rome for Cisco Roma in co-ownership deal. He made some improvement in the fourth division, with 2 goals in half season. In January 2007 he was transferred to fellow fourth division club Castelnuovo, which also in the same mini-group. In August 2007 he left for Massese. He made a breakthrough, with 8 goals in the third division. However that is not enough to make Udinese bought back Artistico. Instead Udinese gave up the remain 50% registration rights of Artistico.

He remain in 2008–09 Lega Pro Prima Divisione, the first season third division bored that name. Again he played for two clubs that season, for Juve Stabia and Pistoiese. He found his shoes for the latter, scoring 0.5 goals per game. Artistico also scored in the relegation "play-out", but the team lost the playoff, relegated and then bankrupted.

Pescara
On 8 July 2009 he was signed by another third division club Pescara. The club also signed forwards Massimo Ganci, Marco Sansovini and Francesco Zizzari. He failed to compete a place in starting XI, despite Antonello Cuccureddu also picked him 8 times in the first half of the season until Cuccureddu was fired after the game against Cavese on 12 January. Artistico played his 9th and last start of the season under new coach Eusebio Di Francesco on 17 January against Lanciano. On 29 January Artistico left for Serie B bottom team Gallipoli with option to co-own the player. Gallipoli relegated and bankrupted at the end of season, while Pescara promoted back to the second division as playoff winner.

Despite Artistico scored 0.33 goals per game in his median Serie B season, Di Francesco excluded Artistico from his 2010–11 Serie B plan. On the last day of transfer window, Artistico was loaned to third division club Ternana. Coach Gabriele Baldassarri regularly picked Artistico as starting forward (9 rounds, from round 3 to 17) but Artistico failed to score. Since the appointment of Manuele Domenicali as head coach, Domenicali only picked Artistico twice, in round 18 and 21 as starting XI. His striking partner Raffaele Nolè, also scored once only before the winter break. Only Romano Tozzi Borsoi had a regular goal scoring record. On 31 January 2011, he last day of transfer window, Artistico was loaned to fellow third division Group B club Lanciano. Artistico made 6 appearances only with the Abruzzo team. Lanciano finished in the mid-table while Ternana almost relegated. His performance did not made either clubs to purchase him outright.

Frosinone
On 25 July 2011 Pescara made an exchange with Frosinone. Artistico and Simone Vitale joined the Lazio team for €130,000 in 2-year contract and €100,000 in 3-year contract respectively while defender Antonio Bocchetti moved to Abruzzo for €170,000. Artistico himself signed a 2-year contract. Frosinone was 75 km away from Rome and recently relegated from the second division. Yet again Artistico had to compete for the starting place as Eugenio Corini only picked Artistico 7 times as starting forward. Artistico scored 3 goals before the winter break while his competitor Salvatore Aurelio (however also his partner in 4–3–1–2 formation) and Antonino Bonvissuto scored 4 times and 3 times respectively. His old team-mate Ganci, only started 4 times with 2 goals. Among the 7 starts, Artistico was one of the 2 forwards in 4–3–1–2 formation, or one of the forward in 4–3–3 formation.

On 30 July 2012 Frosinone terminated the contract with Artistico in mutual consent.

References

External links
 Football.it Profile 
 Sky Italia Profile 
 
 
 

Italian footballers
Serie B players
S.S. Chieti Calcio players
Atletico Roma F.C. players
U.S. Massese 1919 players
S.S. Juve Stabia players
U.S. Pistoiese 1921 players
Delfino Pescara 1936 players
A.S.D. Gallipoli Football 1909 players
Ternana Calcio players
S.S. Virtus Lanciano 1924 players
Frosinone Calcio players
Association football forwards
Footballers from Rome
1985 births
Living people
Pol. Monterotondo Lupa players